Frenchtown is a settlement on the island of Saint Thomas in the United States Virgin Islands. It is located on the south coast, to the west of the capital, Charlotte Amalie and to the east of the settlement of Altona.

Populated places in Saint Thomas, U.S. Virgin Islands